is a Japanese football player for FC Imabari.

Playing career
After being a protagonist at University of Tsukuba, Noguchi joined Giravanz Kitakyushu in January 2018.

Club statistics
Updated to 23 August 2018.

References

External links

Profile at J. League
Profile at Giravanz Kitakyushu

1996 births
Living people
Association football people from Ōita Prefecture
Japanese footballers
J2 League players
J3 League players
Giravanz Kitakyushu players
FC Imabari players
Association football midfielders